Jessie M. Branson (December 21, 1920–January 3, 2009) was an American politician who served as a Democratic member of the Kansas House of Representatives from 1981 to 1990. He represented the 44th District and lived in Lawrence, Kansas.

References

1920 births
2009 deaths
Democratic Party members of the Kansas House of Representatives
Politicians from Lawrence, Kansas
20th-century American politicians
People from Atchison County, Kansas